Ryan Adam Merritt (born February 21, 1992) is an American former professional baseball pitcher who played in Major League Baseball (MLB) for the Cleveland Indians in 2016 and 2017.

Career
Merritt was raised in Celina, Texas, and is a graduate of Celina High School, where he lettered in baseball and football. He then attended McLennan Community College.

Cleveland Indians
The Cleveland Indians selected Merritt in the 16th round of the 2011 Major League Baseball draft. Merritt spent the next five seasons in the Indians' farm system. In 2014, he had a 13–3 win–loss record and a 2.58 earned run average (ERA) for the Carolina Mudcats, and followed that up with 12 wins in 2015 between the Columbus Clippers and the Akron Aeros, the Indians' AAA and AA affiliates.

The Indians added him to their 40-man roster on November 20, 2014. Merritt started Game 5 of the 2016 American League Championship Series, just his second major league start; he pitched  shutout innings against Toronto, giving up two hits and striking out three. Merritt is one of only two pitchers in MLB history to have started just one game in the regular season before pitching in the postseason, the other being Matt Moore.

On July 13, 2018, Merritt was designated for assignment. After clearing waivers, Merritt was outrighted to the minor leagues on July 21. He elected free agency on November 3, 2018.

Tampa Bay Rays
On November 14, 2018, Merritt signed a minor league deal with the Tampa Bay Rays. He spent the 2019 season with the Durham Bulls, the Rays' AAA affiliate, and had a 7.04 ERA in 27 games. Merritt became a free agent following the 2019 season.

References

External links

1992 births
Living people
People from McKinney, Texas
Baseball players from Texas
Major League Baseball pitchers
Cleveland Indians players
McLennan Highlanders baseball players
Arizona League Indians players
Mahoning Valley Scrappers players
Lake County Captains players
Carolina Mudcats players
Akron RubberDucks players
Columbus Clippers players
Durham Bulls players
Leones del Escogido players
American expatriate baseball players in the Dominican Republic